Tomoxia muriniceps is a species of beetle in the genus Tomoxia of the family Mordellidae. It was described by David Sharp in 1886.

References

Beetles described in 1886
Tomoxia